DYMF (963 AM) Bombo Radyo is a radio station owned and operated by Bombo Radyo Philippines through its licensee People's Broadcasting Service, Inc. Its studio and offices are located at Bombo Radyo Broadcast Center, 87-A Borromeo St., Cebu City; its transmitter is located at Sitio Alaska, Brgy. Mambaling, Cebu City. It operates daily from 4:00 AM to 10:00 PM.

DYMF is former home of the Bombo Radyo Drama Production Center, now spun off as the Cebu's Extremes Travel & Entertainment Provider (Cebu City) Corp. It is still supplying drama programming to all cebuano-speaking Bombo Radyo stations in Visayas and Mindanao.

DYMF used to air NBA games in the 90s.

DYMF went off the air on December 16, 2021, after its transmitter was destroyed by Typhoon Rai (Odette). During the time being, several of its programs were aired on its sister station under the interim name Bombo Radyo Star FM. It resumed operations on February 16, 2022, this time with a newly installed transmitter.

References

News and talk radio stations in the Philippines
Radio stations in Metro Cebu
Radio stations established in 1978